Senator Jordan may refer to:

Ambrose L. Jordan (1789–1865), New York State Senate
B. Everett Jordan (1896–1974), U.S. Senator from North Carolina from 1958 to 1973
Barbara Jordan (1936–1996), Texas State Senate
Chester B. Jordan (1839–1914), New Hampshire State Senate
Cornelius T. Jordan (1855–1924), Virginia State Senate
Daphne Jordan (born 1959), New York State Senate
David Lee Jordan (born 1934), Mississippi State Senate
Jen Jordan (born 1974), Georgia State Senate
Jim Jordan (American politician) (born 1964), Ohio State Senate
Keith Jordan (born 1950), Tennessee State Senate
Kris Jordan (born 1977), Ohio State Senate
Leonard B. Jordan (1899–1983), U.S. Senator from Idaho
Luther Jordan (1950–2002), North Carolina State Senate
Maryanne Jordan (born 1956), Idaho State Senate
Nick Jordan (politician) (born 1949), Kansas State Senate
Robert B. Jordan (born 1932), North Carolina State Senate